Sigrid Niehaus (born 29 December 1969) is a Costa Rican swimmer. She competed in three events at the 1988 Summer Olympics.

References

1969 births
Living people
Costa Rican female swimmers
Olympic swimmers of Costa Rica
Swimmers at the 1988 Summer Olympics
Place of birth missing (living people)
Central American and Caribbean Games gold medalists for Costa Rica
Central American and Caribbean Games medalists in swimming
Competitors at the 1986 Central American and Caribbean Games
20th-century Costa Rican women
21st-century Costa Rican women